Alive is an album by Brazilian hard rock band Dr. Sin. It was recorded during their 1997/1998 concert tour. This album contains 7 live tracks and 2 new studio tracks.

Track listing

Personnel 
 Andria Busic – (Bass/Lead Vocals)
 Ivan Busic – (Drums/Backing Vocals)
 Eduardo Ardanuy – (Guitars)

References

Dr. Sin albums
1999 live albums